Bill Luetkenhaus (born September 15, 1962) is an American politician who served in the Missouri House of Representatives from the 12th district from 1993 to 2003.

References

1962 births
Living people
Democratic Party members of the Missouri House of Representatives